Eritrea and Russia relations are diplomatic relations between the State of Eritrea and the Russian Federation. Russia has an embassy in Asmara and Eritrea has its own in Moscow.

In 2018 Russia and Eritrea announced their intentions to build a logistics center in an unnamed Eritrean port city. In January 2023 the foreign minister of Russia and senior advisors traveled to Eritrea meeting with the president of Eritrea, Eritrean foreign minister and other senior officials.

History
During the 2022 Russian invasion of Ukraine, Eritrea was one of only four countries not including Russia, to vote against a United Nations General Assembly resolution condemning Russia's actions.

References 

 
Russia
Bilateral relations of Russia